Star Collection is a compilation album by Spanish duo Baccara released in Germany on label BMG-Ariola in 1991. 
This compilation includes recordings by the original formation of the duo, Mayte Mateos and María Mendiola, taken from their RCA-Victor studio albums Baccara (1977), Light My Fire (1978) and the greatest hits collection The Hits Of Baccara (1978).

Track listing

 "Yes Sir, I Can Boogie"  (Dostal - Soja)  - 4:33
 "The Devil Sent You To Lorado"  (Dostal - Soja)  - 4:07 
 "Cara Mia"  (Docker - Soja)  - 2:59
 "Parlez-Vous Français?"  (Soja - Dostal - Zentner)  - 4:25  
 "Number One"  (Soja - Dostal)  - 2:37 
 "Yummy Yummy Yummy"  (Levine - Resnick)  - 4:25
 "Sorry, I'm A Lady"  (Dostal - Soja)  - 3:39
 "Granada"  (Lara)  - 4:21 
 "Baby, Why Don't You Reach Out?" / "Light My Fire"  (Edited version) (Soja - Dostal) / (Densmore - Krieger -  Manzarek - Morrison)  - 4:46
 "La Bamba"  (Traditional)  - 3:04 
 "Koochie-Koo"  (Dostal - Soja)  - 4:04  
 "Adelita"  (Traditional)  - 2:31 
 "Somewhere in Paradise"  (Soja - Zentner)  - 4:12 
 "Darling"  (7" version) (Dostal - Soja)  - 5:28
 "Gimme More"  (Soja - Zentner) - 3:50
 "Can't Help Falling In Love" (Creatore - Peretti - Weiss) - 3:26

Personnel
 Mayte Mateos - vocals
 María Mendiola - vocals

Production
 Produced and arranged by Rolf Soja.

Track annotations
 Tracks 1, 3, 5, 7, 8, 11, 15 & 16 from 1977 studio album Baccara.
 Tracks 2 & 13 from 1978 compilation The Hits Of Baccara.
 Tracks 4, 6, 9, 10, & 12 from 1978 studio album Light My Fire.
 Track 14 from 1978 7" single "Darling". Full-length version appears on album Light My Fire.

Baccara albums
1991 compilation albums
Bertelsmann Music Group compilation albums